Patrick Boyde, FBA (born 1934) is a British Italianist and retired academic. He was Serena Professor of Italian at the University of Cambridge from 1981 to 2002 and has been a fellow of St John's College, Cambridge, since 1966.

Career 
Born in 1934, Boyde studied at St John's College, Cambridge, graduating in 1956 and then completing a PhD in 1963. After a year as an assistant lecturer at the University of Leeds, he was appointed to an assistant lectureship at the University of Cambridge in 1962 and was eventually promoted to a full lectureship; he was then appointed Serena Professor of Italian in 1981, serving until retirement in 2002. He was also elected to a fellowship at St John's College in 1966. In 1987, Boyde was elected a Fellow of the British Academy, the United Kingdom's national academy for the humanities.

Publications 

 (Edited with Kenelm Foster) Dante's Lyric Poetry (Clarendon Press, 1967).
 Dante's Style in his Lyric Poetry (Cambridge University Press, 1971).
 Dante Philomythes and Philosopher: Man in the Cosmos (Cambridge University Press, 1981).
 Perception and Passion in Dante's Comedy (Cambridge University Press, 1993). 
 (Edited with Zygmunt Barański) Lettura del Fiore (Longo Editore, 1993).
 (Co-authored with Vittorio Russo) Dante e la scienza (Longo Editore, 1995).
 (Co-authored with Zygmunt Barański) The Fiore in Context: Dante, France, Tuscany (University of Notre Dame Press, 1997) .
 Human Vices and Human Worth in Dante's Comedy (Cambridge University Press, 2000).

References 

Living people
1934 births
Alumni of St John's College, Cambridge
Academics of the University of Cambridge
Fellows of St John's College, Cambridge
Fellows of the British Academy